Club Atlético Deva is a football team based in Unquera, Val de San Vicente in the autonomous community of Cantabria. Founded in 1950, the team plays in Regional Preferente. The club's home ground is El Llance, which has a capacity of 2,000 spectators.

Season to season

10 seasons in Tercera División

External links
official website

Football clubs in Cantabria
Association football clubs established in 1950
Divisiones Regionales de Fútbol clubs
1950 establishments in Spain